At the 1932 Summer Olympics in Los Angeles, 29 athletics events were contested. It was the first time the 50 kilometres race walk appeared in the athletic program at the Games. This was the second time women's events in athletics were included in the Olympic Games program and the first time that women competed in the javelin throw and 80m hurdles at the Olympics. There was a total of 386 participants from 34 countries competing.

The athletics events took place at Los Angeles Olympic Stadium, now the Los Angeles Memorial Coliseum.

Medal summary

Men

Women

Records broken
Of the 29 events competed new Olympic records were set in all but three: men's long jump, high jump and hammer throw. World records were set in 10 events.

Men's world records

Women's world records

References

External links 
International Olympic Committee results database
1932 Summer Olympics results: athletics, from https://www.sports-reference.com/; retrieved 2010-03-09.
Official report

 
1932 Summer Olympics events
1932
International track and field competitions hosted by the United States